Alfred-Faure or Port Alfred is a permanent French scientific station on Île de la Possession (Possession Island) of the subantarctic Crozet Archipelago in the South Indian Ocean.

Research Station
It is located at the eastern end of the island on a plateau 143 m (460 ft) above sea level. Depending on the season, there are between 15 and 60 personnel working at the base. Their scientific work includes meteorological, seismic, biological and geological research.

The research station was first established during the austral summer of 1963–1964. It replaced a temporary scientific base that was built in 1961. The new station was named after Alfred Faure, who was the site's leader in the early 1960s.

Alfred-Faure is visited a few times a year by the Marion Dufresne, an oceanographic research vessel which delivers supplies and rotating crews of scientists. There is a 1.6 km road that connects the research station to the coast. An aerial cableway also runs up from the coast to the station.

Climate

References

External links
 Virtual Map of Ile de la Possession

Crozet Islands
Research stations
1963 establishments in France